was a private junior college in Nagasaki, Nagasaki, Japan. The predecessor of the school, a sewing school, was founded in 1892. It was chartered as a women's junior college in 1953 and became coeducational in 2007. it closed down in March 2012.

External links
 Official website 

Educational institutions established in 1892
Private universities and colleges in Japan
Universities and colleges in Nagasaki Prefecture
Japanese junior colleges
1892 establishments in Japan